Lech Szymańczyk (born 15 May 1949 in Wola Młocka) is a Polish politician. He was elected to Sejm on 25 September 2005, getting 7393 votes in 16 Płock district as a candidate from Samoobrona Rzeczpospolitej Polskiej list.

He was also a member of Polish Sejm 1993-1997 and Polish Sejm 1997–2001.

See also
Members of Polish Sejm 2005-2007

External links
Lech Szymańczyk - parliamentary page - includes declarations of interest, voting record, and transcripts of speeches.

1949 births
Living people
People from Ciechanów County
Members of the Polish Sejm 2005–2007
Members of the Polish Sejm 1993–1997
Members of the Polish Sejm 1997–2001
Self-Defence of the Republic of Poland politicians
Democratic Left Alliance politicians